Macallé may refer to:
Mek'ele, capital city in the northern Tigray Region of Ethiopia
Italian submarine Macallé